Sci-Tech Daresbury, also known as Sci-Tech Daresbury Enterprise Zone, is a science and innovation campus near the village of Daresbury in Halton, Cheshire, England. The site began life as the Daresbury Laboratory later adding the Cockcroft Institute, Innovation Centre, Vanguard House and ITAC. Over 1,300 people work on the campus for nearly 150 high tech companies. The science park was formerly known as Daresbury Science and Innovation Campus. In 2012 it was given enterprise zone status and renamed Sci-Tech Daresbury.

Daresbury Laboratory

Projects
 ALICE (accelerator), an electron accelerator previously known as ERLP (Energy Recovery Linac Prototype).
 EMMA (accelerator) an electron accelerator experiment based on the FFAG accelerator concept.

Cockcroft Institute

The Cockcroft Institute is an international centre for Accelerator Science and Technology (AST) in the UK. It was proposed in September 2003 and officially opened in September 2006. It is a joint venture of Lancaster University, the University of Liverpool, the University of Manchester, the Science and Technology Facilities Council, and the Northwest Regional Development Agency. The Institute is located in a purpose-built building on the Daresbury campus, and in centres in each of the participating universities.

References

Science and Technology Facilities Council
Science and technology in Cheshire
Science parks in the United Kingdom